Honister Crag is a fell in the English Lake District. It has a height of 634 metres.  It is adjacent to Fleetwith Pike, a higher summit, but it can claim to be a fell in its own right, as it is a Nuttall – one of the hills in England and Wales that are at least 2,000 feet (610 metres) high with a relative height of at least 15 metres (49.2 feet).

Honister Crag is of interest to rock-climbers.

In Art and Literature
Letitia Elizabeth Landon's poetical illustration "Honister Crag, Cumberland", to an engraving of a painting by Thomas Allom, relates to a border skirmish between the Graemes and the Elliotts in the valley beneath.

Protected area
A Site of Special Scientific Interest has been designated to protect the plant life and features of geological interest. Honister Crag SSSI also covers part of Fleetwith Pike.

References

External links

 Info on Honister Crag becoming a Nuttall

Fells of the Lake District
Nuttalls
Buttermere, Cumbria (village)